Zărand is a commune in Arad County, Romania.  It lies over approximately 7600 hectares on the Crișurilor Plateau, at the confluence of the Cigher and Crișul Alb rivers. It is composed of two villages, Cintei (Köröscsente) and Zărand (situated at 51 km from Arad).

Population
According to the last census the population of the commune counts 2674 inhabitants, out of which 90.9% are Romanians,
0.2% Hungarians, 8.5% Roma and 0.4% are of other or undeclared nationalities.

History
The first documentary record of Zărand dates back to 1318, while Cintei was first mentioned in 1396.

Economy
The economy of the commune is prevalently agrarian, the locality is known in the region as an important grain-growing and
plant-growing area.

Tourism
Although it is not abundant in spectacular touristic elements, the picturesque landscapes of the Crişul Alb River and Cigher River, as well as the traditions and hospitality of the inhabitants are worth experiencing

References

Communes in Arad County
Localities in Crișana